Hailey Danz (née: Danisewicz, born January 9, 1991) is an American paratriathlete. She won the silver medal in the women's PT2 event at the 2016 Summer Paralympics held in Rio de Janeiro, Brazil. She also won the silver medal in the women's PTS2 event at the 2020 Summer Paralympics held in Tokyo, Japan.

References

External links 
 
 Hailey Danz, Team USA
 Hailey Danz, triathlon.org

Living people
1991 births
Place of birth missing (living people)
American female triathletes
Paratriathletes of the United States
Paratriathletes at the 2016 Summer Paralympics
Paratriathletes at the 2020 Summer Paralympics
Medalists at the 2016 Summer Paralympics
Medalists at the 2020 Summer Paralympics
Paralympic silver medalists for the United States
Paralympic medalists in paratriathlon
21st-century American women